David Hahn, or "Radioactive Boy Scout", (1976-2016) attempted to build a homemade breeder nuclear reactor in 1994, at age 17.

David Hahn may also refer to:
David Hahn (Canadian politician) (1925–2012), Canadian member of Parliament
David Hahn (American politician) (born 1955), 2006 Democratic candidate for Governor of Nebraska
David Hahn (cartoonist) (born 1967), American comic book artist
David Hahn, CEO of BC Ferries
Dave Hahn, mountain guide, journalist and lecturer